Michael Fay may refer to:
Sir Michael Fay (banker) (born 1949), New Zealand merchant banker in the America Cup's Hall of Fame
J. Michael Fay (born 1956), explorer and biologist
Michael D. Fay, American war artist
Michael Francis Fay (born 1960), British botanist
Michael P. Fay (born 1975), American caned in Singapore in 1994 for vandalism